All You Need Is Ears: The inside personal story of the genius who created The Beatles is the 1979 memoir of The Beatles' producer George Martin, co-authored by Jeremy Hornsby. The book was republished in 1994. The title is a play-on-words to the 1967 Beatles song "All You Need is Love".

The book describes Martin's early life as well as his career with EMI/Parlophone, where he first signed and produced The Beatles. He also describes working with some of the other artists he produced during the 1960s.

References

1979 non-fiction books
Books about the Beatles
George Martin
British memoirs
Collaborative non-fiction books
Macmillan Publishers books